Simon Bondi (1774 – 20 December 1816) was a German maskil and lexicographer of the Talmud.

He wrote, together with his brother , the Or Ester ('Light of Esther'), a Hebrew dictionary of the Latin words occurring in the Talmud, targumim and midrashim (Dessau, 1812). They also wrote a similar work on the Greek words, which was never printed. The periodical Jedidja (i. 117–125) contains a biographical obituary of Simon by his brother Mordecai.

Bondi was related to the author  and the court factor and banker Simon Isaac Bondi. His sister Sophie married into the Warburg family of Hamburg.

Bibliography

References
 

1774 births
1816 deaths
19th-century German Jews
19th-century lexicographers
German lexicographers
Linguists of Hebrew
Jewish German writers
Jewish lexicographers
People from Dresden
People of the Haskalah